The following is a discography of production by Shinsadong Tiger.

2005

The Jadu – Jadu 4 
 04. "Namgwa Yeo"

2006

Jang Woo Hyuk – My Way 
 08. "oH, No! (feat. Gisang)"

2007

Eru – Eru Returns 
 11. "Insamal" (인사말; "Greetings")

Kim Dong Wan – Kimdongwan Is 
 08. "Yeoreumi Joha (feat. Andy)" (여름이 좋아; "Loving Summer")

Na Yoon Kwon – Hu 
 07. "It's Alright"

2008

MC Mong – Show's Just Begun 
 13. "Yennal Yetjeoge" (옛날 옛적에; "In The Old Days") (co-written by Heo In Chang, Hoo Na Hoon, Jang In Tae, MC Mong, Park Jang Geun, David Kim and Ee Dari)

Jewelry – Kitchi Island 
 03. "One More Time"
 05. "The Cradle Song"
 07. "Modu Da Swit!" (모두 다 쉿!; "Everybody Shh!")

Kim Jong Kook – Here I Am 
 09. "Sarange Chwihae (feat. JoosuC)"  (사랑에 취해; "Drunk on Love")

Mighty Mouth – Energy 
 02. "Eneoji (feat. Sun Ye)" (에너지; "Energy")

Mario – Time To Mario

 05. "Neoman Gwaenchantamyeon" (너만 괜찮다면; "If You Don't Mind")
 09. "Duseoeomneun Norae" (두서없는 노래)

2009

Koyote – Jumping 
 04. "더! (More!)"

4minute – For Muzik 
 02. "Muzik" (co-produced by Lee Sang-ho)
 03. "Hot Issue" (co-produced by Lee Chae-kyu)
 04. "What a Girl Wants" (co-produced by Lee Sang-ho)
 06. "안줄래 (Won't Give You)" (co-produced by Choi Kyu-sung)

Beast – Beast Is the B2st 
 01. "Beast Is the Best" (co-produced by  Choi Gyu Sung)
 02. "Bad Girl" (co-produced by Lee Sang-ho)
 03. "Mystery" (co-produced by Lee Sang-ho and Kang Ji-won)
 04. "아직은 (Yet)"

T-ARA – Absolute First Album 
 01. "One & One" (co-produced by Choi Gyu Sung)
 02. "Bo Peep Bo Peep" (co-produced by Choi Gyu Sung)

2010

T-ARA – Breaking Heart 
 02. "내가 너무 아파 (I'm Really Hurt) (co-produced by Choi Gyu Sung)

Hyuna – Change 
 01. "Change"

ZE:A – Leap for Detonation 
 03. "Man 2 Man" (arrangement)

Beast – Shock of the New Era 
 01. "Just Before Shock" 
 02. "Shock" (co-produced by Lee Sang-ho)
 03. "Special" (co-produced by Lee Sang-ho)

Beast – Mastermind 
 01. "Mastermind" 
 02. "숨 (Breath)" (co-produced by Choi Gyu Sung)

Secret – Secret Time 
 02. "Magic" (co-produced and written by Kim Ki Bum and Kang Ji Won)

U-kiss – i like you 
 01. "i like you"

4Minute – Hit Your Heart 
 01. "Who's Next"
 02. "Huh" 
 03. "Invitation" (co-produced by Im Sang-hyuk)
 04. "I My Me Mine" (co-produced by Lee Sang-ho)

Beast – Lights Go On Again 
 01. "Lights Go On Again" (co-produced by DA9297, co-written by Hong Seungsung, DA9297, and Yong Junhyung)
 02. "Beautiful" (co-produced by Kim Dohoon and Lee Sangho, co-written by Kim Dohoon and Lee Sangho)
 03. "니가 제일 좋아 (I Like You the Best)"  (co-produced by Lee Chaekyu and Jeongoon, co-written by Yong Junhyung)
 04. "Lightless" (co-produced by Rado and Choi Gyu Sung)

Beast – My Story 
 02. "Thanks To" (co-produced and written by Yong Jun-hyung and Yang Yo-seob)
 04. ""Lights Go On Again (Full Version)" (co-produced by DA9297, co-written by Hong Seungsung, DA9297 and Yong Jun-hyung)

IU – Real 
 06. "미리 메리 크리스마스 (Merry Christmas in Advance) (feat. Cheondung of MBLAQ)"

T-ARA – Temptastic 
 06. "몰라요 (I Don't Know)" (co-produced by Choi Gyu Sung)

2011

Park Jung Min – Not Alone 
 01. "Not Alone"
 02. "넌 알고 있니 (Do You Know)"

G.NA – Black & White 
 08. "Supa Solo"

Dalmatian – Dalmatian: 1st Mini Album 
 02. "그 남자는 반대 (The Man Opposed)"

5dolls – Club Remix Album: Time to Play 
 03. "네가 없이도 (Without You)"

4Minute – 4Minutes Left 
 01. "4Minutes Left" (Intro) (co-written by Im Sang-hyuk and Choi Gyu Sung)
 02. "거울아 거울아 (Mirror Mirror)" (co-written by Blue Magic)
 03. "Heart to Heart"  (co-written by Choi Gyu Sung)
 08. "First"  (Korean version) (co-written by Jeon He-won)
 09. "Hide & Seek"  (co-written by Choi Gyu Sung)

Beast – Fiction and Fact 
 01. "The Fact" (co-produced by Choi Gyu Sung, co-written by Choi Gyu Sung and Yong Jun-hyung)
 02. "Fiction" (co-produced by Choi Gyu Sung, co-written by Choi Gyu Sung and Yong Jun-hyung)

Jang Woo Hyuk – I Am the Future 
 08. "Sigani Meomchun Na Time Is [L]over" (시간이 멈춘 날)

Hyuna – Bubble Pop! 
 02. "Bubble Pop!" (co-produced and co-written by Choi Gyu Sung)
 03. "Downtown (Feat. Jeon Ji-yoon)" (co-produced and co-written by Choi Gyu Sung)

T-ARA – John Travolta Wannabe 
 01. "Roly-Poly" (co-produced by Choi Gyu Sung)

Apink – Seven Springs of Apink 
 01. "Wishlist"

C-REAL – Round 1 
 04. "Geuleoji Jom Ma" (그러지 좀 마 "Don't Do That")

Kim Wan-sun and Yong Jun-hyung – Be Quiet 
 01. "Be Quiet" (co-written by Yong Jun-hyung and Good Life 2)

Apink – Snow Pink 
 02. "My My" (co-written by Rado)
 03. "Yeah" (music co-written by Choi Gyu Sung)

Trouble Maker – Trouble Maker 
 01. "Trouble Maker"(co-written by EXID's LE)

2012

Led Apple – Time is up 
 01. "time is up"

T-ara – Funky Town 
 01. "Lovey-Dovey" (co-produced by Choi Kyu-sung)

EXID – HOLLA 
 01. "I Do"
 02. "Whoz That Girl"

Secret – Talk That 
 01. "Talk That"

4minute – Volume Up 
 02. "Volume Up" (co-produced by Rado)

VIXX – Rock Ur Body 
 01. "Rock Ur Body"

T-ARA – Mirage 
 01. "Sexy Love"

Wonder boyz – Open the door 
 01. "open the door"

Jewelry – Look at me 
 01. "Look at me" (co-written by EXID's LE)
 02. “Rhythm Ha!!!”

Apink – Une Annee 
 06. "Step" (only the music)
 08. "I Got You" (co-produced by Kim Tae Joo)

EXID – Hippity Hop
01. "Better Together"
02. "I Feel Good"
03. "매일밤 (Every Night)"
04. "Think About"
05. "Whoz That Girl (Part 2)"

2013

Dynamic Black – SBS Gayo Daejeon The Color of Kpop
01. "Yesterday"

SPEED – Superior Speed 
01. "It's Over" (co-produced by Kim Tae-joo and Hyuwoo)

Dasoni (EXID sub-unit) – Goodbye 
01. "Goodbye"

Apink – Secret Garden 
02. "NoNoNo" (co-written by Kupa)

Ailee – A's Doll House 
01. "U&I" (co-produced by Kupa)

F-ve Dolls – First Love 
03. "LOV"

T-ARA – Again 
01. "Number 9" (co-produced by Choi Kyu-sung)

Trouble Maker – Chemistry 
01. "내일은 없어 (Now)" (co-produced by Rado) (co-written by EXID's LE)

Fiestar – Curious 
02. "아무것도 몰라요 (I Don't Know)"
03. "머리 어깨 무릎 발 (Head, Shoulders, Knees and Toes)"

T-ARA – Again 1977 
01. "나어떡해 (Do You Know Me)"

VIXX – Voodoo
05. "Only U"

BtoB – Thriller
03. "Why"

2014

Dal Shabet – B.B.B
02. "B.B.B (Big Baby Baby)"
05. "B.B.B (Big Baby Baby) (Shinsadong Tiger Remix)"

C-CLOWN – Justice
02. "Justice"

SPEED – Look At Me Now
01. "Look At Me Now"

SPEED – Speed Circus
02. "놀리러 간다 (Don't Tease Me)"

Park Jung-ah – Doctor Stranger OST Part 6 
01. "Because of You"

Fiestar – One More
01. "하나 더 (One More)"

T-ARA – And & End
01. "Sugar Free (BigRoom Version)"
02. "Sugar Free"(co-written by EXID's LE)
04. "ORGR"

EXID – Up & Down
01. "Up & Down"(co-written by EXID's LE)

Apink – Pink Luv
01. "Luv" (co-written by Beom & Nang)

T-ara & Chopstick Brothers – "Little Apple"
 01. "Little Apple"

Badkiz – "Babomba (just the composer with 어퍼컷)"
01. 바밤바 (BABOMBA)

2015

A.kor – Always
01. "Always"

Fiestar – Black Label
01. "짠해 (You're Pitiful)"
06. "타이트해 (So Tight)"

Crayon Pop – FM
01. "FM"

Shannon – Eighteen
04. "20 Inch" (co-produced by Monster Factory)

DIA – Do It Amazing
03. "왠지 (Somehow)"
04. "내 친구의 남자친구 (My Friend's Boyfriend)"

EXID – Ah Yeah (all co-written by LE) 
01. "아예 (Ah Yeah)'" 
02. "아슬해 (Risky)"	
03. "토닥토닥 (Pat Pat)"	
04. "With Out U"  	
05. "1M"
06. "위아래 (Up & Down)" 
07. "Every Night (Version 2)"

EXID – Hot Pink
01. "Hot Pink"

Apink – Pink Memory
01. "Remember"

2016

SoljiHani/Dasoni (EXID sub-unit) – Only One
01. "Only One"(co-produced by SleepWell, co-written by LE)

EXID – Street 
01. "데려다줄래 (Will You Take Me?)" 
02. "L.I.E"
05. "Cream" 
07. "Only One"
09. "냠냠쩝쩝 (Are You Hungry)" (Jung Hwa & Hyerin)
12. "Hot Pink" (Remix)
13. "L.I.E" (Jannabi Mix)

CLC – NU.CLEAR 
02. "No Oh Oh" (co-written by Beom & Nang)

Cosmic Girls – The Secret 
01. "비밀이야  (Secret)" (co-produced by e.one)

Apink – Pink Revolution 
02. "Oh Yes" (co-written by Beom & Nang)

Dal Shabet – Fri. Sat. Sun 
02. "FRI. SAT. SUN (금토일)" (co-written by Beom & Nang)

2017

7Senses – Chapter: Blooming 
01. "Like a Diamond"
02. "Kiki's Secret"
04. "Lollipop"

EXID – Eclipse 
01. "Boy" 
02. "Night Rather Than Day" (낮보다는 밤)"
03. "How Why" 
05. "Velvet" (LE Solo)

Apink – Pink Up 
01. "FIVE" (co-written by Beom & Nang)

Hyuna – Following 
02. "Babe" (co-written by Beom & Nang and Hyuna)

2018

Momoland – Great! 
01. "Bboom Bboom"

EXID – Lady 
01. "Lady"

UNI.T – Line 
01. "넘어 (No More)"

Momoland – Fun to the World 
01. "Baam"

DIA – Summer Ade 
02. "Woo Woo"

EXID – I Love You 
01. "I Love You"

2019

DIA – NEWTRO 
01. "WOOWA"

Momoland – Show Me 
01. "I'm So Hot"

EXID – We 
01. "Me&You"

2020

XUM – DDALALA 

 01. "DDALALA"

2021

TRI.BE - TRI.BE Da Loca 

 01. "Loca"
 02. "둠둠타 (Doom Doom Ta)"

TRI.BE – Conmigo 
 01. "러버덤 (Rub-A-Dum)"
 02. "Loro"

TRI.BE – Veni Vidi Vici 
 01. "Would You Run" (우주로)
 02. "Lobo"
 03. "-18"
 04. "Got Your Back"
 05. "True"

2022

TRI.BE – Leviosa 
 01. Kiss
 02. In The Air (777)

EXID – X 
 01. Fire (불이나) 
 02. IDK (I Don't Know)
 04. Fire (불이나) (Eng ver.)

Produced singles from Shinsadong Tiger 

 2009: "Love Train (feat. Kim Hyung Jun of SS501)" (L.E.O)
 2009: "Giogi Anna" (기억이 안나) (Byul)
 2009: "Kiss Day" Byul
 2010: "Fyah" (파이아; "Fire") (Park Myeong-su)
 2010: "Faddy Robot Foundation" (Hyuna, Yong Jun-hyung, Vasco, Outsider, Verbal Jint, Mighty Mouth, Zico
 2010: "Let's Go" (Group of 20)
 2010: "Cabi Song" (2PM and Girls' Generation)
 2010: "5 Bunman" (ANNA)
 2011: "Eojjeoda Majuchin" (어쩌다 마주친; "Someone Met By Chance") (LED Apple)
 2011: "Racing Queen" (Mighty Mouth Ft. Ailee)
 2011: "Dodungnom New Ver." (도둑놈) (Seo Kyung Suk) (arrangement)
 2013: "Open the door"  (Im Chang-jung)
 2014: "Left alone"  (LedApple)
 2015: "2015 잊었니"  APink B&N (Yoon Bo-mi and Kim Nam-joo)  (Two Yoo Project: Sugarman OST Part 1)
 2021: "Santa For You" (TRI.BE)

References

K-pop discographies
Discographies of South Korean artists
Production discographies